The Pigskin Classic was a season-opening college football game played at Anaheim Stadium from 1990 until 1994, and continued from 1995 to 2002 at various stadiums. It was initially created as a west-coast counterpart of the Kickoff Classic and hosted by the National Association of Collegiate Directors of Athletics. From 1990 to 1994 it was sponsored by Disneyland and referred to as the Disneyland Pigskin Classic.  Until 2002 the NCAA only allowed for teams to play a 12-game regular season schedule if the first game were a licensed Classic (such as the Pigskin Classic, the Kickoff Classic, or the Eddie Robinson Classic). In 2002 the NCAA ended the allowance of an extra 12th game, thus effectively ending the Classics. Kickoff games would later see a revival, in 2008 the Chick-fil-A Kickoff Game was organized as a neutral-site game held in Atlanta.

Results

Rankings from AP Poll prior to game.

References 

College football kickoff games
1990 establishments in California
Recurring sporting events established in 1990
2002 disestablishments in the United States
Recurring sporting events disestablished in 2002